Cancer is a large class of malignant diseases.

Cancer may also refer to:

People with the surname 
 Dinah Cancer (born 1960), American punk rock musician
 Luis Cancer (1500–1549), Spanish Dominican missionary
 Jerónimo de Cáncer (c. 1599 – 1655), Spanish playwright

Astronomy and astrology
 Cancer (astrology), an astrological sign
 Cancer (Chinese astronomy), a constellation in Chinese astronomy
 Cancer (constellation)

Arts, entertainment, and media

Music
 Cancer (band), a British death metal band
 Cancer (Confession album)
 Cancer (My Disco album)
 Cancer (Showbread album)
 "Cancer" (My Chemical Romance song)
 "Cancer", a song by Filter from Title of Record
 "Cancer", a song by Joe Jackson from Night and Day
 "Cancer", a song by Sick Puppies from Dressed Up as Life
 "Cancer", a song by Subhumans from Reasons for Existence

Other uses in arts, entertainment, and media
 Cancer (comics), a character in the Marvel Universe
 Cancer (film), a 2015 American documentary film
 Cancer (journal), an academic journal about the disease
 Cancer (Transformers), a character in the Transformers universes

Other uses 
 Cancer (genus), a genus of crab
 Cancer (mythology), a giant crab in Greek mythology
 CANCER, an electronic circuit simulator and predecessor of SPICE

See also 
 55 Cancri, a star system in which NASA has discovered five planets
 Kancer, a fictional character from DC Comics
 Kansar, an Indian dessert
 Tropic of Cancer (disambiguation)
 Tumour
 Malignant (disambiguation)